This is comprehensive list of all government ministries of Uganda, as of June 2021. Below is a list of members of the Ugandan cabinet as of 9 June 2021.

See also
 Cabinet of Uganda
 Parliament of Uganda

References

External links
Profile of The Government At Website of State House, Uganda

Lists of political office-holders in Uganda